Md Shamsul Hasan Khan (born 13 February 1926) was a Member of the Parliament of India in the sixth Lok Sabha, elected from Pilibhit constituency in 1977 as a candidate of the Bharatiya Lok Dal. Khan was son of Mohd. Badrul Hasan Khan, who was the nawab of Sherpur Reasat in the former princely state of Rampur.

Early years
Khan was educated initially at the village school in Sherpur Kalan, of which he later became president. Subsequently, he attended Colonel Brown Cambridge School in Dehradun and then gained a degree from Cambridge University.

Career
Khan joined the Indian National Congress as member of All-India Congress Committee (O) and was president of the District Congress Committee (O) for six years.

He was a prominent agriculturist from Pilibhit, and was also a member of Farmers' forum of India.

He was a renowned social worker in the Pilibhit, known for his support of educational and agricultural development in the Pilibhit District. He experimented and introduced new and scientific methods for the development of agriculture and horticulture, and his movement pioneered rubber plantation in the Tarai area of Pilibhit and Nainital districts.

He was elected as a Member of Parliament for the Sixth Lok Sabha from Pilibhit constituency with 71.32 per cent of the vote as a Bharatiya Lok Dal candidate, defeating a rival representing the Indian National Congress.

Family life
He married Razia Bano Begam. The couple had no children.

References

1926 births
People from Pilibhit district
Activists from Uttar Pradesh
Possibly living people
India MPs 1977–1979
Lok Sabha members from Uttar Pradesh